Indonesia–Panama relations was established in 1979. Since the beginning, both countries has realized the strategic importance of each counterparts; Indonesia sees strategic and geographic importance of Panama as their gate to Central America as well as to reach the Caribbean region, while Panama also has recognized the strategic importance of Indonesia in ASEAN region. Indonesia has an embassy in Panama City, while Panama has an embassy in Jakarta.

During the 2019-2021 Persian Gulf crisis, Indonesia had seized Iranian and Panamanian tanker in Borneo. The two ships had suspected of illegally transferring oil in the waters.

Trade and investment
Indonesia sees Panama as an attractive market with good prospect to grow in the future. Currently Panama is Indonesian's fourth largest trading partner in Latin America after Brazil, Argentina and Chile. Panama Ministry of Trade and Industry has invited Indonesian business to invest and take the opportunity in Colon Free Zone (CFZ) as the center of economic activity in Panama.

In 2011, the bilateral trade volume between Indonesia and Panama has reached US$218.7 million, a 45.1% increase compared to 2010 trade that booked US$150.7 million. Since 2007 to 2011, the bilateral trade shows increasing trend of average 33.7% increase annually. Indonesian main export to Panama are footwear, electronic parts, textile, and vehicle tire. While Indonesian imports from Panama mainly in shipping sector, such as passenger and cargo vessel, oil tanker, also ferrous waste and scrap.

Culture
Indonesian embassy in several occasions has promoted Indonesian culture to Panama public, such as diplomatic reception on August 28, 2013. This includes the demonstration of Balinese bridal wear, paintings and decorations, the traditional music of Bali, slides show of photographs of Indonesian provinces as well as the presentation of some Indonesian dishes . 
Indonesian traditional textiles,  batik and ikat made its first appearance in Fashion Week Panama from October 10–12 in Atlapa Convention Centre. This event showcased 15 works of Panama fashion designer Isabel Chacín that inspired and applied Indonesian batik and ikat into her works.  These efforts to introduce Indonesia are expected to strengthen Indonesia-Panama diplomatic relation.

See also 
 Foreign relations of Indonesia
 Foreign relations of Panama

Notes

External links
Embassy of Indonesia in Panama City, Panama
Embassy of Panama in Jakarta, Indonesia

Panama
Bilateral relations of Panama